Netín is a municipality and village in Žďár nad Sázavou District in the Vysočina Region of the Czech Republic. It has about 400 inhabitants.

Administrative parts
The village of Záseka is an administrative part of Netín.

History
The first written mention of Netín is in a forgery from the end of the 12th century, which states the year 1156.

References

Villages in Žďár nad Sázavou District